The 153rd Regiment Illinois Volunteer Infantry was an infantry regiment that served in the Union Army during the American Civil War.

Service
The 153rd Illinois Infantry was organized at Chicago, Illinois,  and mustered into Federal service on February 27, 1865, for a one-year enlistment.  The 153rd served in garrisoned the line of the Nashville and Chattanooga Railroad and later Memphis, Tennessee.

The regiment mustered out September 15, 1865.

Total strength and casualties 
The regiment suffered 37 enlisted men who died of disease for a total of 37 fatalities.

Commanders
Colonel Stephen Bronson - mustered out with the regiment.

See also
List of Illinois Civil War Units
Illinois in the American Civil War

Notes

References
The Civil War Archive

Units and formations of the Union Army from Illinois
Military units and formations established in 1865
1865 establishments in Illinois
Military units and formations disestablished in 1865